Espenberg may refer to:

 Espenberg, Alaska, a settlement in Alaska
 Espenberg River, a river in Alaska
 Espenberg volcanic field, a volcanic field in Alaska
 Cape Espenberg, a cape on the Seward Peninsula in Alaska

See also
 Espen Berg (born 1981), founder and CEO of the United Youth Development Organization